= Bishopric of Trier =

Bishopric of Trier may refer to:

- The historic Electorate of Trier, an ecclesiastical principality of the Holy Roman Empire that existed from the end of the 9th to the early 19th century
- The modern Roman Catholic Diocese of Trier
